William Edward Bergin (May 18, 1892 – January 23, 1978) was an officer in the United States Army who served as Adjutant General from 1951 to 1954.

Early life and start of career
Bergin was born in Pueblo, Colorado on May 18, 1892, a son of John Bergin and Catherine. He joined the Army in 1917, and received his commission as a second lieutenant after graduating from officers training camp at Fort Riley, Kansas. During World War I he served in Europe with the 20th Infantry Regiment, a unit of the 10th Division, which was later re-designated the 31st Division.

From 1921 to 1925, Bergin was in charge of the Reserve Officers' Training Corps at Georgetown University.

World War II
At the start of World War II, Bergin was adjutant and assistant chief of staff for personnel (G-1) of U.S. Army Forces in Chongqing, China, serving under General Joseph Stilwell. He later served on the Army staff for the China Burma India Theater, and he ended the war as deputy chief of staff of the Tenth U.S. Army, based in Okinawa.

Later career
In 1946, Bergin was assigned to the War Department General Staff. His later assignments included overseas service in Germany and service as the Army's Deputy Adjutant General from 1949 to 1951, and Adjutant General from 1951 to 1954.

Bergin's awards included the Army Distinguished Service Medal and Legion of Merit, as well as China's Order of the Cloud and Banner First Grade.

Retirement and death
In retirement, Bergin was a resident of Washington, D.C. In his later years, he suffered from heart disease. He died at his Washington home on January 23, 1978. Bergin was buried at Arlington National Cemetery. He was survived by his wife Elizabeth.

See also
List of Adjutant Generals of the U.S. Army

References

External links

Generals of World War II

1892 births
1978 deaths
Adjutants general of the United States Army
United States Army personnel of World War I
Burials at Arlington National Cemetery
People from Pueblo, Colorado
Recipients of the Distinguished Service Medal (US Army)
Recipients of the Legion of Merit
United States Army generals
United States Army generals of World War II
Military personnel from Colorado